Begaana may refer to:

 Begaana (1963 film), a Hindi romantic drama film
 Begaana (1986 film), a Bollywood film